Niko Čeko (born 13 February 1969 in Livno) is a retired Croatian footballer who last played for Hajduk Split.

International career
He made his debut for Croatia in a July 1992 friendly match against Australia, coming on as a 70th-minute substitute for Dražen Biškup, and earned a total of 2 caps, scoring no goals. His second and final international came four days later against the same opposition.

References

External sources

1969 births
Living people
Sportspeople from Livno
Croats of Bosnia and Herzegovina
Association football midfielders
Yugoslav footballers
Croatian footballers
Croatia international footballers
NK Troglav 1918 Livno players
NK Maribor players
NK Zagreb players
HNK Hajduk Split players
HNK Šibenik players
Yugoslav Second League players
Croatian Football League players